The Ministry of Education (Māori: Te Tāhuhu o te Mātauranga) is the public service department of New Zealand charged with overseeing the New Zealand education system.

The Ministry was formed in 1989 when the former, all-encompassing Department of Education was broken up into six separate agencies.

History 

The Ministry was established as a result of the Picot task force set up by the Labour government in July 1987 to review the New Zealand education system. The members were Brian Picot, a businessman, Peter Ramsay, an associate professor of education at the University of Waikato, Margaret Rosemergy, a senior lecturer at the Wellington College of Education, Whetumarama Wereta, a social researcher at the Department of Maori Affairs and Colin Wise, another businessman.
The task force was assisted by staff from the Treasury and the State Services Commission (SSC), who may have applied pressure on the task force to move towards eventually privatizing education, as had happened with other government services. The mandate was to review management structures and cost-effectiveness, but did not include curriculum, teaching or effectiveness. In nine months the commission received input from over 700 people or organizations.

The Picot task force released its report Administering for Excellence: Effective Administration in Education in May 1988.
The report was critical of the Department of Education, which it labelled as inefficient and unresponsive.
The task force conceived of the school charter as a contract between school boards, the local community and central authority and the government accepted many of the recommendations subsequently published in their response – Tomorrow's Schools. This recommended a system where each school would be largely independent, governed by a board consisting mainly of parents, although subject to review and inspection by specialized government agencies.  Another recommendation was that boards of trustees were made responsible to the Minister of Education, who gained the power to dismiss boards.

The Picot report became the basis for a drawn out process of educational reform in New Zealand starting in 1989. When National was elected in October 1990, it carried out a further series of educational reviews culminating in the publication Education Policy: Investing in People, Our Greatest Asset. This resulted in further modifications to the structure of education reform, and according to one academic, created "a system which is a far cry from the Picot intentions... There has been an ongoing series of changes and reassessments that has caused chaos, confusion and massive insecurity throughout the education sector".

Responsibilities
The Ministry's role is to "shape an education system that delivers equitable and excellent outcomes". It is not an education provider. That role is met by licensed early childhood services, individual elected Boards of state schools, the proprietors of State-integrated schools, registered private schools and tertiary education providers. The Ministry has numerous functions – advising government, providing information to the sector, providing learning resources, administering sector regulation and funding, and providing specialist services. The Ministry works with other education agencies including the Education Review Office, the New Zealand Qualifications Authority, the Tertiary Education Commission, Education New Zealand, and the Teaching Council of Aotearoa New Zealand.

Although the Ministry's primary purpose is to in ensuring equitable and excellent outcomes, it is also the mechanism through which the Government of the day implements its education policy. When government changes aspects of its policy on education, the Ministry is responsible for implementing those changes. Sometimes the Ministry ends up in the difficult position of trying to implement politically induced changes in education policy to which teachers, parents, and school boards may be opposed. Changes introduced by the National Government in 2008–2012 are an example.

In order for the Ministry and the wider education sector to perform its role effectively, it is dependent on taxpayer funding provided by Government. When government increases funding or requires financial cutbacks, this also impacts on the ability of the Ministry to fulfil its role. In 2013, the Government provided about $12.2 billion to fund education in New Zealand. By 2021, the Education budget was some $16.3 billion.

Ministers 
The Ministry serves 1 portfolio, 1 minister, 1 associate minister and 1 parliamentary under-secretary.

See also 
 Education in New Zealand
 History of education in New Zealand

References

Bibliography

External links

TeachNZ, a business unit of MoE
Te Kete Ipurangi – The Online Learning Centre, an initiative of MoE
The Education Gazette, published by MoE

Education
Education in New Zealand
New Zealand
New Zealand, Education